The Kinnaird College for Women (KCW) is a university located in Lahore, Pakistan. It is a women's liberal arts university.

Kinnaird was established in 1913 by the Zenana Bible and Medical Mission. In 1919, Presbyterian Mission Church and the Church Mission Society joined a consortium to fund and operate the college. In 1926 it moved to its current campus on the Jail Road, where it grew over the years and by 1939 the college had grown into a  campus.

The college is named after Lady Mary Jane Kinnaird co-founder of YWCA and a great philanthropist of her time.
The now university was established at the start of the 20th century when it was housed near Kinnaird High School. In 2002 college was given the status of government Degree Awarding institution and its administration was handed over to Association of Kinnaird College. Board of governors run its administration.

History
Kinnaird College was founded in 1913 by the Zenana and Bible Medical Mission when they started college classes at Kinnaird Christian Girls' High School in Lahore. The founders wished to give Punjabi Christian women the opportunity to gain professional qualifications as teachers. The first principal was Joan MacDonald.

From 1913 to 1922 the college was the only women's liberal arts college in the Punjab. In its initial years, college life was designed for the predominately Christian student body and on graduation many students found employment in the mission school network. The popularity of missionary schools among non-Christian families, with their emphasis on English language teaching and the chance to study with British and American teachers, led to a demand for the type of graduate teachers produced by the College. 

In 1928, Isabella McNair became principal of the College. McNair believed that women's education should be intellectually equal to men's and alumnae encouraged to be active in public life.  During the 1930s, admission standards, teacher/pupil ratios, extracurruclar activities and a fee schedule set Kinnaird apart as the region's most prestigious women's college. The demographics had also shifted with a majority of pupils now coming from middle to upper class Hindu families, where an English education from a leading women's college was regarded as an important step in arranging a good marriage. 

After Partition in 1947, the University of the Punjab Senate decided to replace English with Urdu as the medium of instruction and examination for higher education. Despite this change, Kinnaird continued to offer women higher education in newly created Pakistan and added science courses, typing, nursing and social work to its curriculum. Partition however significantly altered the student body, with Muslims, a minority at Kinnaird before 1947, now becoming a large majority. 

In 1972, the Pakistani government nationalised all private schools and colleges, including Kinnaird.
In 2002, Kinnaird college was given Charter of Degree Awarding institution and the board of governor was set up to run its administration.

Degrees and courses
Kinnaird launched its honors program in 2003, the four year bachelors followed by a dissertation. An honors degree is available in the following subjects:

 Biochemistry
 Botany
 English Literature
 English Language and Linguistics
 Environmental Science
 Statistics
 Food and Nutrition
 Psychology
 Physics
 French
 Political Science
 Law
 Media Studies
 International Relations
 Urdu
 Business Administration 
 Zoology
 Geography
 Economics
 Mathematics
 Computer Science
 Biotechnology

One and two year master's degrees are available in the following:
 English Literature 
 Environmental Science
 International Relations
 English Literature
 English Language Teaching
 Business Administration 
 Media Studies

M.Phil degree offered in:
 Computer Science
 Statistics
 Environmental Science
 English Literature
 International Relations
English Language Teaching

Radio Kinnaird 97.6 FM
Radio Kinnaird 97.6 FM is a campus radio of Kinnaird College for Women University. The test transmission of this radio channel was started in June 2010.

Students' Council
The Students' Council was formed under the Presidency of the Senior Student assisted by the Deputy Senior Student and the Hostel Deputy.

Principals
1913-1928: Joan McDonald
1928-1950: Isabella McNair
1950-1969: Mangat Rai
1972-2004: Mira Phailbus
2004-2005: Ira Hasan
2005-2009: Mira Phailbus
2009-2010: Bernadette Louise Dean
2010-present: Rukhsana David

Notable alumni

Fawzia Afzal-Khan, professor
Zubeida Agha, artist
Vaneeza Ahmad, model, actress
Sheherezade Alam, ceramist
Gurbinder Kaur Brar, politician
Sana Bucha, journalist and TV anchor
Gul Bukhari, journalist
Bushra Anjum Butt, politician
Madeeha Gauhar, actress
Maha Raja, lawyer, politician
Muneeza Hashmi, actress
Farzana Hassan, author and activist
Shamim Hilaly, actress
Tasneem Zehra Husain, physicist
Nasira Iqbal, judge
Zeb Jaffar, politician
Asma Jahangir, lawyer and activist
Kanza Javed, author
Nida Jay, author, educationist
Kamini Kaushal, actress
Juggan Kazim, actress, TV presenter
Sara Raza Khan, singer
Hadiqa Kiani, singer
Sabeen Mahmud, human rights activist
Jugnu Mohsin, journalist
Savera Nadeem, actress
Afia Nathaniel, writer, director, producer
Musarrat Nazir, musician, actress
Bano Qudsia, author
Zainab Qayyum, model, actress, TV presenter
Begum Akhtar Riazuddin, activist, author
Irtiza Rubab, actress
Ayesha Sana, actress, host
Rubina Saigol, activist, educationalist
Shabnam Shakeel, poet
Ayesha Siddiqa, political scientist
Bapsi Sidhwa, author
Sara Suleri, author, professor
Tahira Syed, ghazal singer
Kashmala Tariq, politician
Shahzadi Umerzadi Tiwana, politician
Naseem Zehra, journalist, anchor

Dr Surriya Shafi Mir, educationist
Tasneem Karim aka bunna, Daredevil
Shunila Ruth, politician

References

External links

 Kinnaird College

 
Women's universities and colleges in Pakistan
Educational institutions established in 1913
1913 establishments in India
Universities and colleges in Lahore
Public universities and colleges in Punjab, Pakistan
Anglican schools in Pakistan